Bhabanipur, Bhawanipur, Bhowanipore, or Bhowanipor may refer to the following places:

India

West Bengal
 Bhowanipore, a locality in Kolkata
 Bhabanipur, Purba Medinipur

Bihar
 Bhawanipur, Bihar
 Bhawanipur (community development block)
 Bhawanipur Rajdham

Uttar Pradesh
 Bhawanipur, Sareni, a village in Raebareli district
 Rampur Bhawanipur

Bangladesh
 Bhabanipur, Rajshahi Division
 Bhabanipur Shaktipeeth, in Bogra District
 Bhabanipur Kali Mandir, a temple in Sherpur Upazila of Bogra District

Nepal
 Bhawanipur, Sunsari
 Bhawanipur, Janakpur
 Bhawanipur Jitpur
 Bhawanipur, Parsa
 Bhawanipur, Sagarmatha
 Ganj Bhawanipur
 Simara Bhawanipur